Ruwanpura Grama Niladhari Division is a Grama Niladhari Division of the Attanagalla Divisional Secretariat of Gampaha District of Western Province, Sri Lanka. It has Grama Niladhari Division Code 370B.

Ruwanpura is a surrounded by the Opathella, Aruppassa, Happitiya, Lavulupitiya, Lavulupitiya, Paranagama, Paranagama East, Walgammulla and Walgammulla Grama Niladhari Divisions.

Demographics

Ethnicity 
The Ruwanpura Grama Niladhari Division has a Sinhalese majority (100.0%). In comparison, the Attanagalla Divisional Secretariat (which contains the Ruwanpura Grama Niladhari Division) has a Sinhalese majority (86.6%) and a significant Moor population (11.9%)

Religion 
The Ruwanpura Grama Niladhari Division has a Buddhist majority (99.9%). In comparison, the Attanagalla Divisional Secretariat (which contains the Ruwanpura Grama Niladhari Division) has a Buddhist majority (84.5%) and a significant Muslim population (12.4%)

References 

Grama Niladhari Divisions of Attanagalla Divisional Secretariat